Fury of Johnny Kid (also known as Ultimate Gunfighter) is a 1967 Italian-Spanish film directed by Gianni Puccini. The Italian and Spanish versions of the film have different endings. The film is a Spaghetti Western version of William Shakespeare's tragedy Romeo and Juliet. Paul Naschy worked as an assistant director on this film, and Director Puccini told him he wanted to bring Naschy back to Rome to work with him on other projects. Sadly, Puccini died in Rome in December 1968, so it was not to be.

Plot 
Two family clans have always been enemies; they spend their time hating and killing each other. The daughter of the Campos family and the son of the Mounter family fall in love, thus causing further hatred and deaths.

Cast 
 Peter Lee Lawrence: Johnny Monter (credited as Arthur Grant) 
 Cristina Galbó: Jiulieta Campos 
 María Cuadra: Rosalind
 Andrés Mejuto: Lefty 
 Piero Lulli: Sheriff 
 Peter Martell: Lodorigo Campos 
 Luis Induni: Father Monter 
 Ana María Noé: Mother Monter 
 Ángel Álvarez: Padre 
 Pepe Rubio: Jack (credited as José Rubio) 
 Luciano Catenacci: Campos henchman 
 Paul Naschy as pistolero in saloon

References

External links

Fury of Johnny Kid at Variety Distribution
 

1967 films
Films directed by Gianni Puccini
Spaghetti Western films
Films based on Romeo and Juliet
1967 Western (genre) films
1960s Italian films